Vantanea is a genus of flowering plants in the family Humiriaceae.

Species include:
Vantanea celativenia
Vantanea compacta
Vantanea depleta McPherson
Vantanea guianensis
Vantanea magdalenensis Cuatrec.
Vantanea minor
Vantanea obovata
Vantanea occidentalis
Vantanea parviflora
Vantanea peruviana J.F. Macbr.
Vantanea spichigeri A.H. Gentry

References

Humiriaceae
Malpighiales genera
Taxonomy articles created by Polbot